Miletopolis or Miletoupolis (Μιλητούπολις) was a town in the north of ancient Mysia, at the confluence of the rivers Macestus and Rhyndacus, and on the west of the lake which derives its name from the town. It was a Milesian colony. Strabo mentions that a part of the inhabitants of the town were transferred to Gargara at some indeterminant time.

It was Christianised at an early date and remains a bishopric of the Greek Orthodox Church and a titular see of the Roman Catholic Church. The current Greek Orthodox Bishop to hold the title of Miletopolis is Bishop Iakovos of Miletopolis who serves as an assistant bishop in the Greek Orthodox Archdiocese of Australia.

Its site is located near Karacabey, Bursa Province, Turkey.

References

Populated places in ancient Mysia
Former populated places in Turkey
Milesian colonies
Catholic titular sees in Asia
Dioceses of the Ecumenical Patriarchate of Constantinople
History of Bursa Province